Daouk or Al Daouk or Ad Daouk is a common Arabic family name. Notable people with the surname include:

  Daouk Family, Arabic family name
Ahmad Daouk, former Lebanese Prime Minister in 1941-1942 and in 1960
Hazem Daouk, financial economist
Walid Daouk (born 1958), Lebanese politician and minister